Irina Anatolyevna Ilchenko (born 3 August 1968 in Ivanovo), known as Irina Ilchenko or Irina Smirnova, is a Russian volleyball player. Born in Yekaterinburg, she competed for the Soviet Union at the 1988 Summer Olympics, the Unified Team at the 1992 Summer Olympics, and Russia at the 1996 Summer Olympics.

She is the mother of the Russian player Ksenia Ilchenko Parubets.

References

External links 
 

1968 births
Living people
Sportspeople from Yekaterinburg
Soviet women's volleyball players
Russian women's volleyball players
Volleyball players at the 1988 Summer Olympics
Volleyball players at the 1992 Summer Olympics
Volleyball players at the 1996 Summer Olympics
Olympic volleyball players of the Soviet Union
Olympic volleyball players of the Unified Team
Olympic volleyball players of Russia
Olympic silver medalists for the Unified Team
Olympic gold medalists for the Soviet Union
Olympic medalists in volleyball
Medalists at the 1992 Summer Olympics
Medalists at the 1988 Summer Olympics
Honoured Masters of Sport of the USSR
Competitors at the 1990 Goodwill Games
Goodwill Games medalists in volleyball
Galatasaray S.K. (women's volleyball) players
Eczacıbaşı volleyball players
Russian expatriate sportspeople in Italy
Russian expatriate sportspeople in Croatia
Russian expatriate sportspeople in Turkey
Expatriate volleyball players in Italy
Expatriate volleyball players in Turkey